The Tucson Mexican All-Stars team was an Arizona League baseball team based in Tucson, Arizona, made up of developmental players from the Mexican League. It played from 1998 to 2000 at the Tucson Electric Park spring training complex.

The team consisted of 19-and-under Mexican League academy players. Most players remained within leagues in Mexico with a few playing the minor leagues (from Rookie to Triple A) in the United States. None have advanced to the MLB.

Year-by-year record

References

 Baseball Reference

Baseball teams established in 1998
Baseball teams disestablished in 2000
Defunct Arizona Complex League teams
Professional baseball teams in Arizona
1998 establishments in Arizona
2000 disestablishments in Arizona
Defunct baseball teams in Arizona